Samuel Joseph Nevills (July 19, 1925 – March 28, 2005) was a Canadian football player who played for the Winnipeg Blue Bombers. He played college football at Purdue University and the University of Oregon.

References

1925 births
2005 deaths
American football tackles
Canadian football tackles
American players of Canadian football
Oregon Ducks football players
Winnipeg Blue Bombers players
Players of American football from Iowa
People from Waterloo, Iowa